Prélude à l'après-midi d'un faune (L. 86), known in English as Prelude to the Afternoon of a Faun, is a symphonic poem for orchestra by Claude Debussy, approximately 10 minutes in duration. It was composed in 1894 and first performed in Paris on 22 December 1894, conducted by Gustave Doret. The flute solo was played by Georges Barrère.

The composition was inspired by the poem L'après-midi d'un faune by Stéphane Mallarmé. It is one of Debussy's most famous works and is considered a turning point in the history of Western art music, as well as a masterpiece of Impressionist composition. Pierre Boulez considered the score to be the beginning of modern music, observing that "the flute of the faun brought new breath to the art of music."

Debussy's work later provided the basis for the ballet Afternoon of a Faun choreographed by Vaslav Nijinsky and a later version by Jerome Robbins.

Background

About his composition Debussy wrote:The music of this prelude is a very free illustration of Mallarmé's beautiful poem. By no means does it claim to be a synthesis of it. Rather there is a succession of scenes through which pass the desires and dreams of the faun in the heat of the afternoon. Then, tired of pursuing the timorous flight of nymphs and naiads, he succumbs to intoxicating sleep, in which he can finally realize his dreams of possession in universal Nature.

Paul Valéry reported that Mallarmé himself was unhappy with his poem being used as the basis for music:
He believed that his own music was sufficient, and that even with the best intentions in the world, it was a veritable crime as far as poetry was concerned to juxtapose poetry and music, even if it were the finest music there is.
However, after attending the premiere performance at Debussy's invitation, Mallarmé wrote to Debussy: "I have just come out of the concert, deeply moved. The marvel! Your illustration of the Afternoon of a Faun, which presents no dissonance with my text, but goes much further, really, into nostalgia and into light, with finesse, with sensuality, with richness. I press your hand admiringly, Debussy. Yours, Mallarmé."

Composition

The work is scored for three flutes, two oboes, cor anglais, two clarinets in A and B, two bassoons, four horns, two harps, two crotales and strings.

Although it is tempting to call this piece a tone poem, there is very little musical literalism in the piece; instead, the slow and mediated melody and layered orchestration as a whole evoke the eroticism of Mallarmé's poem.
[This prelude] was [Debussy's] musical response to the poem of Stephane Mallarmé (1842–1898), in which a faun playing his pan-pipes alone in the woods becomes aroused by passing nymphs and naiads, pursues them unsuccessfully, then wearily abandons himself to a sleep filled with visions. Though called a "prelude," the work is nevertheless complete – an evocation of the feelings of the poem as a whole.Debussy had intended to compose a second and third movement, an Interlude and Paraphrase finale, respectively, but he decided to concentrate all of his musical ideas into one movement.

The Prélude at first listening seems improvisational and almost free-form; however, closer observation will demonstrate that the piece consists of a complex organization of musical cells, motifs carefully developed and traded between members of the orchestra. A close analysis of the piece reveals a high amount of consciousness of composition on Debussy's part.

The main musical themes are introduced by woodwinds, with delicate but harmonically advanced accompaniment of muted horns, strings and harp. Recurring tools in Debussy's compositional arsenal make appearances in this piece: extended whole-tone scale runs, harmonic fluidity without lengthy modulations between central keys, and tritones in both melody and harmony. The opening flute solo consists of a chromatic descent to a tritone below the original pitch and then subsequent ascent. Debussy uses sophisticated voicings and orchestration, allowing the main melodic cell to move from solo flute to oboe, back to solo flute, then to two unison flutes (yielding a completely different atmosphere to the melody), then to clarinet, and so on. Even the accompaniment explores alternate voicings: the flute duo's crescendo during their melodic cells accompany legato strings with violas carrying the soprano part over alto violins (the tone of a viola in its upper register being especially pronounced).

Main theme

Ambiguous chord progression

Theme

Theme – similar to the main theme in chromaticism and contour. Uses a whole-tone scale in m. 32.

Theme – similar contour to the main theme.

Secondary theme

Theme – new melodic idea created by combining fragments of two previous melodies.

Theme – related to main theme.

Final chromatic harmonization of the main theme

The composition totals 110 bars. If one counts the incomplete lines of verse as one, Mallarmé's text likewise adds up to 110 lines. The second section in D-flat starts at bar 55, exactly halfway through the work.

Ballet versions

In 1912, the piece was made into a short ballet, with costumes and sets by painter Léon Bakst, which was choreographed and performed by renowned dancer Vaslav Nijinsky. It proved to be highly controversial because of the dancers' non-traditional movements and because of a moment in which the faun appears to masturbate.

In 1958, another ballet by Jerome Robbins was made, which has been frequently performed by many companies.

Literature

In Thomas Mann's The Magic Mountain it is implied that protagonist Hans Castorp listened to Debussy's piece on a gramophone. In the book, the Prélude is one of his favorite recordings, and leads him to daydream about a faun playing pipes in an oneiric landscape.

Transcription

Claude Debussy himself transcribed the piece for performance on two pianos in 1895.

Other transcriptions include: the arrangement of Maurice Ravel for piano four hands, the flute and piano version of Gustave Samazeuilh, the arrangement for Pierrot ensemble (flute, clarinet, violin, cello and piano) by Tim Mulleman, a transcription for flute, clarinet and piano by Michael Webster, and an arrangement for the instruments of Ravel's Introduction and Allegro (flute, clarinet, harp and string quartet) with an additional double bass, by Graeme Steele Johnson. The Russian pianist Vyacheslav Gryaznov also transcribed it for solo piano. Linos Piano Trio arranged the piece for piano trio and included it on their 2021 album "Stolen Music".

Benno Sachs, a pupil of Arnold Schoenberg, reorchestrated the work for a chamber ensemble which included a piano and a harmonium, for Schoenberg's Society for Private Musical Performances, which took place on 27 October 1920.

In popular culture

Film
The theme features prominently in the film Portrait of Jennie (1949), and is used as a musical motif for the ethereal heroine played by Jennifer Jones.
Prelude to the Afternoon of a Faun is the first animated segment in Italian director and animator Bruno Bozzetto's film Allegro Non Troppo (1977). While retaining Debussy's music, the on-screen story instead depicts an aging faun's vain attempts to recapture his youth.
A climactic scene from the film Passion (2013) finds the main character attending the ballet version, with a memorable, several-minute-long split screen, with the ballet on one side and the movie action on the other side.

Lectures
The work is analyzed at the end of the 4th segment of Leonard Bernstein's Norton lecture The Unanswered Question (1973). Bernstein corroborates the earlier statement that the piece, with its extensive use of the tri-tone interval and whole-tone scale, stretches the limits of tonality, thus setting up the atonal works of the 20th century to come.

Music
It was rearranged and recorded by jazz musician Eumir Deodato for his album Prelude (1973).
A synthesiser arrangement was performed by Isao Tomita on his album Firebird (1975).
Electronic jazz group Koop features the Overture in its piece 'Glömd' (1997) on its album Sons of Koop.

Television
A production music version (arranged by Charlotte Georg) was featured in The Ren & Stimpy Show episode, "Powdered Toast Man".

References

Further reading
 
 Hendrik Lücke: "Mallarmé – Debussy. Eine vergleichende Studie zur Kunstanschauung am Beispiel von L'Après-midi d'un Faune". (Studien zur Musikwissenschaft, vol. 4). Dr. Kovac, Hamburg 2005, .

External links

 
 Prélude à l'après-midi d'un faune, score, patachonf.free.fr
 Program notes by Richard Freed, January 2004
, Tmesis Ensemble, Etcetera Records 2019

Compositions by Claude Debussy
Symphonic poems
1894 compositions
Music based on poems
Preludes (music)
Articles containing video clips
Adaptations of works by Stéphane Mallarmé